Dino: Italian Love Songs is an album by Dean Martin for Capitol Records, released in 1962.  The sessions producing this album's songs were recorded between September 6 and September 8 of 1961.  Dino: Italian Love Songs was released on February 5, 1962 (see 1962 in music).  The backing orchestra was conducted and arranged by Gus Levene.  The original album consisted of twelve songs with distinct Italian themes.

Track listing

LP
Capitol Records Catalog Number (S) T-1659

Side A
"Just Say I Love Her (Dicitencello Vuie)" (Jack Val, Jimmy Dale, Martin Kalmanoff, Sam Ward) – 2:47. Session 10276; Master 36542. Recorded September 7, 1961.
"Arrivederci Roma" (Renato Rascel, Carl Sigman) – 2:41. Session 10274; Master 36411. Recorded September 6, 1961.
"My Heart Reminds Me" (Camillo Bargoni, Paul Siegel, Al Stillman) – 2:28. Session 10278; Master 36454. Recorded September 8, 1961.
"You're Breaking My Heart (Mattinata)" (Pat Genaro, Sunny Skylar) – 2:45. Session 10276; Master 36449. Recorded September 7, 1961.
"Non Dimenticar (Don't Forget)" (Michele Galdieri, Shelly Dobbins, P.G. Redi) – 3:05. Session 10274; Master 36443. Recorded September 6, 1961.
"Return To Me (Ritorna a Me)" (Danny Di Minno, Carmen Lombardo) – 2:44. Session 10274; Master 36436. Recorded September 6, 1961.

Side B
"Vieni Su" (Johnny Cola) – 2:26. Session 10278; Master 35455. Recorded September 8, 1961.
"On an Evening in Roma (Sott'er Celo de Roma)" (Sandro Taccani, Umberto Bertini, Nan Fredricks) – 2:28. Session 10276; Master 36450. Recorded September 7, 1961.
"Pardon (Perdoname)" (Carmen Lombardo, Danny DiMinno) – 3:00. Session 10276; Master 36451. Recorded September 7, 1961.
"Take Me in Your Arms (Torna a Surriento)" (adaptation by Joseph J. Lilley) – 2:38. Session 10278; Master 36453. Recorded September 8, 1961.
"I Have But One Heart (O Marenariello)" (Johnny Farrow, Marty Symes) – 3:02. Session 10274; Master 36444. Recorded September 6, 1961.
"There's No Tomorrow (O Sole Mio)" (Eduardo di Capua, Al Hoffman, Leo Corday, Leon Carr) – 2:48. Session 10274; Master 364828. Recorded September 6, 1961

Compact Disc
1997 EMI/Capitol combined Dino: Italian Love Songs with Cha Cha de Amor (also from 1962). Catalog Number 7243 8 55393 2 9.

2005 Collectors' Choice Music reissue added four more tracks to the twelve tracks on the original Capitol LP. Catalog Number WWCCM06052.
"Bella, Bella Bambina" (Adolph Ross, Addy Baron) – 2:34.
"Giuggiola" (Nisa / Sammy Cahn, Corrado Lojacono) – 2:07.
"Simpatico" (Arthur Schwartz, Sammy Cahn) – 2:52. Session 3755; Master 13743-7. Recorded April 25, 1955.
"Belle from Barcelona" (Dante de Paulo, Louis Yule Brown) – 2:48. Session 3402; Master 12571-6. Recorded April 20, 1954.

Personnel 

Dean Martin – vocals
Robert F. Bain – guitar
Alton R. Hendrickson – guitar
Allan J. Reuss – guitar
Murray Shapinsky – bass
Nick Fatool – drums
Louis 'Lou' Singer – drums
Kermit 'Ken' Lane – piano
Carl L. Fortina – accordion
Justin DiTullio – cello
Armond Kapproff – cello (Session 10276 and 10278)
Raphael Kramer – cello (Sessions 10274 and 10278)
Edgar Lustgarten – cello (Sessions 10274 and 10276)
Kurt Reher – cello (Session 10274)
Ann Mason Stockton – harp
Joseph DiFiore – viola (Session 10278)
Alvin Dinkin – viola (Sessions 10274 and 10276)
Alan Harshman – viola (Session 10274)
Louis Kievman – viola (Sessions 10276 and 10278)
Virginia Majewski – viola
Paul Robyn – viola
Victor Arno – violin
Israel Baker – violin
Kurt Dieterle – violin
Jacques Gasselin – violin (Sessions 10276 and 10278)
James Getzoff – violin (Sessions 10274 and 10278)
Ben Gill – violin (Sessions 10274 and 10278
Anatol Kaminsky – violin
Nathan Kaproff – violin
Joseph Livoti – violin
Daniel Lube – violin
Louis Raderman – violin (Sessions 10274 and 10276)
Mischa Russel – violin (Sessions 10276 and 10278)
Marshall Sosson – violin (Session 10274)
Harry Zagon – violin

Notes

Dean Martin albums
1962 albums
Capitol Records albums
Albums produced by Dave Cavanaugh
Italian-language albums